John Vallins (Born 19 January 1950) is an Australian Gold and Platinum award winning songwriter/musician best known for his 1970s song "Too Much, Too Little, Too Late".

One of only a handful of Australian songwriters ever to make No 1 on the American Billboard Chart, the song reached the top position in May 1978 sung as a duet by Johnny Mathis and Deniece Williams. It was top ten in both Canada and the UK and certified Gold by the R.I.A.A and the BPI. It was also covered by English band Silver Sun in 1998 and reached number 20 in the UK singles chart.

Early life

John grew up in the Melbourne suburb of Kew, and in his early teens formed "The Kinetics" with school friends Steve Groves, Ian Manzie and Ken Leroy. The band had some success on the local charts and worked the many dances and clubs that sprang up in Melbourne in the mid-1960s, splitting in 1967. During the next few years John worked with many bands including a re-formed ‘Kinetics’ with Ian Manzie, John Wickman and Mal Nichols, ‘The Trap’ with Yvonne Barrett on vocals, an unnamed band with musicians Gil Mathews, Gary Mobely and Alan Turnbull and ‘The Vibrants’  with Penny Parsons, Geoff Skewes, Mick Hamilton and Trevor Courtney. It was also around this time that he began working as a studio musician.

1970s

In 1971 John travelled to London to join friends Steve Groves and Steve Kipner in the band Tin Tin which achieved Top 20 chart success in the US with "Toast and Marmalade for Tea" produced by Maurice Gibb. Managed by Robert Stigwood, Tin Tin joined the Bee Gees on an extended tour of the United States where their set consisted mostly of songs from their well received new album "Astral Taxi".  After Tin Tin split, John spent much of the seventies working in London as a studio musician, while working and writing with Steve’s father Nat Kipner producing tracks for various artists. It was around this time they wrote Too Much, Too Little, Too Late. Returning to Australia in the late 70s, John and fellow aussies Gary Keady and John Phelps started the band "World" along with London studio musicians Adrian Wyatt and Eric Cairns. Much of the bands repertoire was devoted to music written by John and Gary Keady for what was the genesis of a rock opera titled "Star Lord".

1980s to present

John moved into writing music for advertising in the 1980s. Working firstly out of Alberts Studios, where he worked with producers Bruce Brown and Russell Dunlop. Later with Michael Wilson at EMI Studios where he produced and wrote multi award winning tracks for clients like American Express, Apple Inc., Dilmah Tea, De Beers, Domino’s Pizza, 2Day FM, 2JJJ, 2SM, 2WS, Streets, Bulmers, McDonald's, Nestle, John Walker, Smith's Crisps, and many more! As well as having written songs for Australian, European and South American headliners and American icons such as Barry White, in the 90s John started his own Music Production Company in Australia concentrating mainly on music for advertising, but also co-writing songs for the score of Tristan Malls film Billy's Holiday, and Gary Keady’s cult film Sons of Steel with songs also featured in The World Music Festival in Japan.

His songs have been covered and performed by a wide range of artists around the world including Johnny Mathis, Deniece Williams, Patti Austin, Tom Jones, Barry White, Filipino sensations Mark Bautista and Sarah Geronimo, Silversun and Acker Bilk, to name a few.

John continues to work from the comfort of his studios in the Northern Rivers District of New South Wales, and has recently completed new compositions with senior Nashville writers as well as a new album with local country band "Gunnado". He takes great interest in working with, and supporting young writers, partially in conjunction with his annual workshop at Camp Creative which is patroned by David and Gillian Helfgott, and is a long term board member and presenter at local radio station 2BBB FM.

See also
List of Billboard Hot 100 number-one singles of 1978
Tin Tin (band)
Too Much, Too Little, Too Late

References

External links
Official John Vallins Music page

Australian songwriters
1950 births
Living people